Iván Forte Ortega (born 25 August 1988) is a Spanish footballer who plays for CD Eldense as a midfielder.

Club career
Born in Elda, Province of Alicante, Forte finished his youth career with local Alicante CF, and made his senior debuts with the reserves in the 2007–08 season. On 20 December 2008 he played his first game with the main squad, coming on as a second-half substitute in a 0–3 away loss against Real Zaragoza in the Segunda División championship; he appeared in a further five league games until the end of the campaign, which ended in relegation.

On 27 June 2011, after dropping another level with the Valencian, Forte joined Ontinyent CF in Segunda División B. On 7 July of the following year he signed with Racing de Ferrol in Tercera División, achieving promotion in his first season and contributing with 37 games and three goals to the feat.

References

External links

1988 births
Living people
People from Elda
Sportspeople from the Province of Alicante
Spanish footballers
Footballers from the Valencian Community
Association football midfielders
Segunda División players
Segunda División B players
Tercera División players
Alicante CF footballers
Ontinyent CF players
Racing de Ferrol footballers
CD Ebro players
CF La Nucía players
CD Eldense footballers